The 154th Boat Race took place on 29 March 2008.   Held annually, the event is a side-by-side rowing race between crews from the Universities of Oxford and Cambridge along the River Thames. Oxford won the race.  Oxford's crew featured the oldest competitor in Boat Race history.  The race took place in very difficult weather conditions – strong winds and heavy rain – resulting in the slowest winning time in over sixty years. Oxford won by six lengths, the largest margin of victory since the 2004 race.

Oxford's Isis beat Cambridge's Goldie in the reserve race, while Oxford won the Women's Boat Race.

Background
The Boat Race is a side-by-side rowing competition between the University of Oxford (sometimes referred to as the "Dark Blues") and the University of Cambridge (sometimes referred to as the "Light Blues").  First held in 1829, the race takes place on the  Championship Course on the River Thames in southwest London.  The rivalry is a major point of honour between the two universities and followed throughout the United Kingdom and broadcast worldwide.  Cambridge went into the race as reigning champions, having beaten Oxford by over a length in the previous year's race and the overall lead, with 79 victories to Oxford's 73 (excluding the "dead heat" of 1877).  The race was sponsored by Xchanging for the fourth time.

The first Women's Boat Race took place in 1927, but did not become an annual fixture until the 1960s. Until 2014, the contest was conducted as part of the Henley Boat Races, but as of the 2015 race, it is held on the River Thames, on the same day as the men's main and reserve races.  The reserve race, contested between Oxford's Isis boat and Cambridge's Goldie boat has been held since 1965.  It usually takes place on the Tideway, prior to the main Boat Race.

Crews
Oxford's crew weighed an average of  more per rower than their opponents, and featured the oldest competitor in Boat Race history in 36-year-old American Mike Wherley.  Cambridge crew consisted of six Britons, two Australians and an American, while Oxford's comprised four Americans, three Britons, an Australian and a German.  Both coxes, Nick Brodie and Rebecca Dowbiggin, were former Blues, while Cambridge also saw 30-year-old Tom Edwards return, having rowed in 2006. Cambridge's boat club president Dan O'Shaughnessy was the seventh Light Blue president not to row in his own Blue Boat.

Race

Oxford were pre-race favourites, but Cambridge won the toss and elected to start from the Surrey station.  Oxford took an early lead, but the boats closed on each other, and the umpire John Garrett was forced to issue a number of warnings to both coxes in an attempt to prevent a collision.  By Craven Cottage, Oxford were nearly a length ahead and Cambridge responded; by the time the crews passed under Hammersmith Bridge they were level.  Along Chiswick Eyot Oxford moved ahead once again, and were clear of Cambridge after 30 strokes.  Oxford extended their lead to pass the finishing post in 20 minutes 53 seconds, six lengths and 22 seconds ahead of their opponents.  Driving rain, strong winds and choppy water resulted in the slowest winning time for over sixty years, but the largest margin of victory since the 2004 race.

Oxford's Isis beat Cambridge's Goldie by  lengths in the reserve race.  Oxford won the 44th running of the Women's Boat Race by half a length.

Reaction

Oxford's Oliver Moore said "we got the rage going in the crew, and we started to kill it, we hit an awesome rhythm".  Cambridge coach Duncan Holland congratulated his opponents: "Well done to Oxford, they were much faster on the day".  Following tradition, the victorious Oxford crew tossed their cox Brodie into the Thames.

References

External links

 Official website

2008 in English sport
2008 in rowing
2008 sports events in London
March 2008 sports events in the United Kingdom
The Boat Race